Jonathan Drakes (born 11 October 1994) is a Barbadian cricketer. He made his List A debut for Combined Campuses and Colleges in the 2018–19 Regional Super50 tournament on 10 October 2018. Prior to his List A debut, he was named in the West Indies' squad for the 2014 Under-19 Cricket World Cup. In October 2019, he was named in the Combined Campuses' squad for the 2019–20 Regional Super50 tournament.

References

External links
 

1994 births
Living people
Barbadian cricketers
Combined Campuses and Colleges cricketers
Place of birth missing (living people)